Subjective well-being (SWB) is a self-reported measure of well-being, typically obtained by questionnaire.

Ed Diener developed a tripartite model of subjective well-being in 1984, which describes how people experience the quality of their lives and includes both emotional reactions and cognitive judgments. It posits "three distinct but often related components of wellbeing: frequent positive affect, infrequent negative affect, and cognitive evaluations such as life satisfaction." Subjective well-being is an overarching ideology that encompasses such things as "high levels of pleasant emotions and moods, low levels of negative emotions and moods, and high life-satisfaction."

SWB therefore encompasses moods and emotions as well as evaluations of one's satisfaction with general and specific areas of one's life. SWB is one definition of happiness.

Although SWB tends to be stable over the time and is strongly related to personality traits, the emotional component of SWB can be impacted by situations; for example, the onset of the COVID-19 outbreak, lowered emotional well-being by 74%. There is evidence that health and SWB may mutually influence each other, as good health tends to be associated with greater happiness, and a number of studies have found that positive emotions and optimism can have a beneficial influence on health.

Construction of SWB
Diener argued that the various components of SWB represent distinct constructs that need to be understood separately, even though they are closely related. Hence, SWB may be considered "a general area of scientific interest rather than a single specific construct". Due to the specific focus on the subjective aspects of well-being, definitions of SWB typically exclude objective conditions such as material conditions or health, although these can influence ratings of SWB. Definitions of SWB therefore focus on how a person evaluates his/her own life, including emotional experiences of pleasure versus pain in response to specific events and cognitive evaluations of what a person considers a good life. Components of SWB relating to affect include positive affect (experiencing pleasant emotions and moods) and low negative affect (experiencing unpleasant, distressing emotions and moods), as well as "overall affect" or "hedonic balance", defined as the overall equilibrium between positive and negative affect, and usually measured as the difference between the two. High positive affect and low negative affect are often highly correlated, but not always.

Components of SWB
There are three components of SWB: affect (hedonic measures), life satisfaction (cognitive measures), and eudaimonia (a sense of meaning and purpose).

Affect 
Affect refers to the emotions, moods, and feelings a person has. These can be all positive, all negative, or a combination of both positive and negative. Some research shows also that feelings of reward are separate from positive and negative affect.

Life satisfaction 
Life satisfaction (global judgments of one's life) and satisfaction with specific life domains (e.g. work satisfaction) are considered cognitive components of SWB. The term "happiness" is sometimes used in regards to SWB and has been defined variously as "satisfaction of desires and goals" (therefore related to life satisfaction), as a "preponderance of positive over negative affect" (therefore related to emotional components of SWB), as "contentment", and as a "consistent, optimistic mood state" and may imply an affective evaluation of one's life as a whole. Life satisfaction can also be known as the "stable" component in one's life. Affective concepts of SWB can be considered in terms of momentary emotional states as well as in terms of longer-term moods and tendencies (i.e. how much positive and/or negative affect a person generally experiences over any given period of time). Life satisfaction and in some research happiness are typically considered over long durations, up to one's lifetime. "Quality of life" has also been studied as a conceptualization of SWB. Although its exact definition varies, it is usually measured as an aggregation of well-being across several life domains and may include both subjective and objective components.

Eudaimonia 
Eudaimonic measures seek to quantify traits like virtue and wisdom as well as concepts related to fulfilling our potential such as meaning, purpose, and flourishing. Eudaimonic measures are often regarded as a core component of SWB, particularly in the field of positive psychology. However, it is unclear whether measures of meaning are really measures of wellbeing and little data has been collected on them.

Measurement 
Life satisfaction and Affect balance are generally measured separately and independently.
 Life satisfaction is generally measured using a self-report method. A common measurement for life satisfaction is questionnaires. 
 Affective balance is also generally measured using a self-report method. An example of a measurement of affective balance is the PANAS (Positive Affect Negative Affect Schedule).
Sometimes a single SWB question attempts to capture an overall picture. For example, the World Happiness Report uses a Cantril ladder survey, in which respondents are asked to think of a ladder, with the best possible life for them being a 10, and the worst possible life being a 0, and are then asked to rate their own current lives on that 0 to 10 scale.

The issue with the such measurements of life satisfaction and affective balance is that they are self-reports. The problem with self-reports is that the participants may be lying or at least not telling the whole truth on the questionnaires. Participants may be lying or holding back from revealing certain things because they are either embarrassed or they may be filling in what they believe the researcher wants to see in the results. To gain more accurate results, other methods of measurement have been used to determine one's SWB.

Another way to corroborate or confirm that the self-report results are accurate is through informant reports. Informant reports are given to the participant's closest friends and family and they are asked to fill out either a survey or a form asking about the participants mood, emotions, and overall lifestyle. The participant may write in the self-report that they are very happy, however that participant's friends and family record that he/she is always depressed. This would obviously be a contradiction in results which would ultimately lead to inaccurate results.

Another method of gaining a better understanding of the true results is through ESM, or the Experience Sampling Method. In this measure, participants are given a beeper/pager that will randomly ring throughout the day. Whenever the beeper/pager sounds, the participant will stop what he/she is doing and record the activity they are currently engaged in and their current mood and feelings. Tracking this over a period of a week or a month will give researchers a better understanding of the true emotions, moods, and feelings the participant is experiencing, and how these factors interact with other thoughts and behaviors. A third measurement to ensure validity is the Day Reconstruction Method. In this measure, participants fill out a diary of the previous days’ activities. The participant is then asked to describe each activity and provide a report of how they were feeling, what mood they were experiencing, and any emotions that surfaced. Thus to ensure valid results, a researcher may tend to use self-reports along with another form of measurement mentioned above. Someone with a high level of life satisfaction and a positive affective balance is said to have a high level of SWB.

Theories
Theories of the causes of SWB tend to emphasize either top-down or bottom-up influences.

Top-down perspective

In the top-down view, global features of personality influence the way a person perceives events. Individuals may therefore have a global tendency to perceive life in a consistently positive or negative manner, depending on their stable personality traits. Top-down theories of SWB suggest that people have a genetic predisposition to be happy or unhappy and this predisposition determines their SWB "setpoint". Set Point theory implies that a person's baseline or equilibrium level of SWB is a consequence of hereditary characteristics and therefore, almost entirely predetermined at birth. Evidence for this genetic predisposition derives from behavior-genetic studies that have found that positive and negative affectivity each have high heritability (40% and 55% respectively in one study). Numerous twin studies confirm the notion of set point theory, however, they do not rule out the possibility that is it possible for individuals to experience long term changes in SWB.

Diener et al. note that heritability studies are limited in that they describe long-term SWB in a sample of people in a modern western society but may not be applicable to more extreme environments that might influence SWB and do not provide absolute indicators of genetic effects. Additionally, heritability estimates are inconsistent across studies.

Further evidence for a genetically influenced predisposition to SWB comes from findings that personality has a large influence on long-term SWB. This has led to the dynamic equilibrium model of SWB. This model proposes that personality provides a baseline for emotional responses. External events may move people away from the baseline, sometimes dramatically, but these movements tend to be of limited duration, with most people returning to their baseline eventually.

Bottom-up perspective

From a bottom-up perspective, happiness is created from happy experiences. Bottom-up influences include external events, and broad situational and demographic factors, including health and marital status. Bottom-up approaches are based on the idea that there are universal basic human needs and that happiness results from their fulfilment. In support of this view, there is evidence that daily pleasurable events are associated with increased positive affect, and daily unpleasant events or hassles are associated with increased negative affect.

However, research suggests that external events account for a much smaller proportion of the variance in self-reports of SWB than top-down factors, such as personality. A theory proposed to explain the limited impact of external events on SWB is hedonic adaptation. Based originally on the concept of a "hedonic treadmill", this theory proposes that positive or negative external events temporarily increase or decrease feelings of SWB, but as time passes people tend to become habituated to their circumstances and have a tendency to return to a personal SWB "setpoint" or baseline level.

The hedonic treadmill theory originally proposed that most people return to a neutral level of SWB (i.e. neither happy nor unhappy) as they habituate to events. However, subsequent research has shown that for most people, the baseline level of SWB is at least mildly positive, as most people tend to report being at least somewhat happy in general and tend to experience positive mood when no adverse events are occurring. Additional refinements to this theory have shown that people do not adapt to all life events equally, as people tend to adapt rapidly to some events (e.g. imprisonment), slowly to others (e.g. the death of a loved one), and not at all to others (e.g. noise and sex).

Factors

Personality and genetics
A number of studies have found that SWB constructs are strongly associated with a range of personality traits, including those in the five factor model. Findings from numerous personality studies show that genetics account for 20–48% of the variance in the Five-Factor Model and the variance in subjective well-being is also heritable. Specifically, neuroticism predicts poorer subjective well-being whilst extraversion, agreeableness, conscientiousness and openness to experience tend to predict higher subjective well-being. A Meta-analyses found that neuroticism, extraversion, agreeableness, and conscientiousness were significantly related to all facets of SWB examined (positive, negative, and overall affect; happiness; life satisfaction; and quality of life). Meta-analytic research shows that neuroticism is the strongest predictor of overall SWB and is the strongest predictor of negative affect.

A large number of personality traits are related to SWB constructs, although intelligence has negligible relationships. Positive affect is most strongly predicted by extraversion, to a lesser extent agreeableness, and more weakly by openness to experience. Happiness was most strongly predicted by extraversion, and also strongly predicted by neuroticism, and to a lesser extent by the other three factors. Life satisfaction was significantly predicted by neuroticism, extraversion, agreeableness, and conscientiousness. Quality of life was very strongly predicted by neuroticism, and also strongly predicted by extraversion and conscientiousness, and to a modest extent by agreeableness and openness to experience. One study found that subjective well-being was genetically indistinct from personality traits, especially those that reflected emotional stability (low Neuroticism), and social and physical activity (high Extraversion), and constraint (high Conscientiousness).

DeNeve (1999) argued that there are three trends in the relationship between personality and SWB. Firstly, SWB is closely tied to traits associated with emotional tendencies (emotional stability, positive affectivity, and tension). Secondly, relationship enhancing traits (e.g. trust, affiliation) are important for subjective well-being. Happy people tend to have strong relationships and be good at fostering them. Thirdly, the way people think about and explain events is important for subjective well-being. Appraising events in an optimistic fashion, having a sense of control, and making active coping efforts facilitates subjective well-being. Trust, a trait substantially related to SWB, as opposed to cynicism involves making positive rather than negative attributions about others. Making positive, optimistic attributions rather than negative pessimistic ones facilitates subjective well-being.

The related trait of eudaimonia or psychological well-being, is also heritable. Evidence from one study supports 5 independent genetic mechanisms underlying the Ryff facets of psychological well-being, leading to a genetic construct of eudaimonia in terms of general self-control, and four subsidiary biological mechanisms enabling the psychological capabilities of purpose, agency, growth, and positive social relations.

Social influences

A person's level of subjective well-being is determined by many different factors and social influences prove to be a strong one. Results from the famous Framingham Heart Study indicate that friends three degrees of separation away (that is, friends of friends of friends) can affect a person's happiness. From abstract: "A friend who lives within a mile (about 1.6 km) and who becomes happy increases the probability that a person is happy by 25%."

Family

Research has not demonstrated that there are significant differences in subjective well-being between childless couples and couples with children. A research study by Pollmann-Schult (2014) found that when holding finances and time costs constant, parents are happier and show increased life satisfaction than non-parents.

Wealth
Research indicates that wealth is related to many positive outcomes in life. Such outcomes include: improved health and mental health, greater longevity, lower rates of infant mortality, experience fewer stressful life events, and less frequently the victims of violent crimes However, research suggests that wealth has a smaller impact on SWB than people generally think, even though higher incomes do correlate substantially with life satisfaction reports.

The relative influence of wealth together with other material components on overall subjective well-being of a person is being studied through new research. The Well-being Project at Human Science Lab investigates how material well-being and perceptual well-being works as relative determinants in conditioning our mind for positive emotions.

In a study done by Aknin, Norton, & Dunn (2009), researchers asked participants from across the income spectrum to report their own happiness and to predict the happiness of others and themselves at different income levels. In study 1, predicted happiness ranged between 2.4 and 7.9, and actual happiness ranged between 5.2 and 7.7. In study 2, predicted happiness ranged between 15-80 and actual happiness ranged between 50 and 80. These findings show that people believe that money does more for happiness than it really does. However, some research indicates that while socioeconomic measures of status do not correspond to greater happiness, measures of sociometric status (status compared to people encountered face-to-face on a daily basis) do correlate to increased subjective well-being, above and beyond the effects of extroversion and other factors.

The Easterlin Paradox also suggests that there is no connection between a society's economic development and its average level of happiness. Through time, the Easterlin has looked at the relationship between happiness and gross domestic product (GDP) across countries and within countries. There are three different phenomena to look at when examining the connection between money and Subjective well-being; rising GDP within a country, relative income within a country, and differences in GDP between countries.

More specifically, when making comparisons between countries, a principle called the Diminishing Marginal Utility of Income (DMUI) stands strong. Veenhoven (1991) said, "[W]e not only see a clear positive relationship [between happiness and GNP per capita], but also a curvilinear pattern; which suggest that wealth is subject to a law of diminishing happiness returns." Meaning a $1,000 increase in real income, becomes progressively smaller the higher the initial level of income, having less of an impact on subjective well-being. Easterlin (1995) proved that the DMUI is true when comparing countries, but not when looking at rising gross domestic product within countries.

Health
There are substantial positive associations between health and SWB so that people who rate their general health as "good" or "excellent" tend to experience better SWB compared to those who rate their health as "fair" or "poor". A meta-analysis found that self-ratings of general health were more strongly related to SWB than physician ratings of health. The relationship between health and SWB may be bidirectional. There is evidence that good subjective well-being contributes to better health.
A review of longitudinal studies found that measures of baseline subjective well-being constructs such as optimism and positive affect predicted longer-term health status and mortality. Conversely, a number of studies found that baseline depression predicted poorer longer-term health status and mortality. Baseline health may well have a causal influence on subjective well-being so causality is difficult to establish.
A number of studies found that positive emotions and optimism had a beneficial impact on cardiovascular health and on immune functioning. Changes in mood are also known to be associated with changes in immune and cardiovascular response.
There is evidence that interventions that are successful in improving subjective well-being can have beneficial effects on aspects of health. For example, meditation and relaxation training have been found to increase positive affect and to reduce blood pressure. The effect of specific types of subjective well-being is not entirely clear. For example, how durable the effects of mood and emotions on health are remains unclear. Whether some types of subjective well-being predict health independently of others is also unclear. Meditation has the power to increase happiness because it can improve self-confidence and reduces anxiety, which increases your well-being. Cultivating personal strengths and resources, like humour, social/animal company, and daily occupations, also appears to help people preserve acceptable levels of SWB despite the presence of symptoms of depression, anxiety, and stress.

Research suggests that probing a patient's happiness is one of the most important things a doctor can do to predict that patient's health and longevity. In health-conscious modern societies, most people overlook the emotions as a vital component of one's health, while over focusing on diet and exercise. According to Diener & Biswas-Diener, people who are happy become less sick than people who are unhappy. There are three types of health: morbidity, survival, and longevity. Evidence suggests that all three can be improved through happiness:

 Morbidity, simply put, is whether or not someone develops a serious illness, such as the flu or cancer. In a 30-year longitudinal study, participants who were high in positive emotions were found to have lower rates of many health problems. Some of these illnesses/problems include lower death rates from heart disease, suicide, accidents, homicides, mental illnesses, drug dependency, and liver disease related to alcoholism. Additionally, results showed that depressed participants were more likely to have heart attacks and recurrences of heart attacks when compared to happy people.
 Survival is the term used for what happens to a person after he/she has already developed or contracted a serious illness. Although happiness has been shown to increase health, with survival, this may not be the case. Survival may be the only area of health that evidence suggests happiness may actually be sometimes detrimental. It is unclear why exactly research results suggest this is the case, however Diener & Biswas-Diener offer an explanation. It is possible that happy people fail to report symptoms of the illness, which can ultimately lead to no treatment or inadequate treatment. Another possible reason may be that happy people tend to be optimistic, leading them to take their symptoms too lightly, seek treatment too late, and/or follow the doctor's instructions half-heartedly. And lastly, Diener & Biswas-Diener suggest that people with serious illnesses may be more likely to choose to live out the rest of their days without painful or invasive treatments.
 Longevity, the third area of health, is measured by an individual's age of death. Head researcher Deborah Danner of the University of Kentucky researched links between an individual's happiness and that individual's longevity. Danner recruited 180 Catholic nuns from a nearby convent as the participants of her study. She chose nuns because they live very similar lives. This eliminates many confounding variables that might be present in other samples, which can lead to inaccurate results. Such confounding variables could include substance use, diet, and sexual risk-taking. Since there are few differences among the nuns as far as the confounding variables, this sample offered the best option to match a controlled laboratory setting. Results showed that nuns who were considered happy or positive in their manner and language on average lived 10 years longer than the nuns who were considered unhappy or negative in their manner and language. A follow-up study by health researcher Sarah Pressman examined 96 famous psychologists to determine if similar results from the nun research would be seen as well. Pressman's results showed that the positive or happy psychologists lived, on average, 6 years longer. The psychologists who were considered negative or unhappy lived, on average, 5 years less.

Physical characteristics
A positive relationship has been found between the volume of gray matter in the right precuneus area of the brain, and the subject's subjective happiness score. A six-week mindfulness based intervention was found to correlate with a significant gray matter increase within the precuneus.

Leisure
There are a number of domains that are thought to contribute to subjective well-being. In a study by Hribernik and Mussap (2010), leisure satisfaction was found to predict unique variance in life satisfaction, supporting its inclusion as a distinct life domain contributing to subjective well-being. Additionally, relationship status interacted with age group and gender on differences in leisure satisfaction. The relationship between leisure satisfaction and life satisfaction, however, was reduced when considering the impact of core affect (underlying mood state). This suggests that leisure satisfaction may primarily be influenced by an individual's subjective well-being level as represented by core affect. This has implications for possible limitations in the extent to which leisure satisfaction may be improved beyond pre-existing levels of well-being and mood in individuals.

Cultural variations

Although all cultures seem to value happiness, cultures vary in how they define happiness. There is also evidence that people in more individualistic cultures tend to rate themselves as higher in subjective well-being compared to people in more collectivistic cultures.

In Western cultures, predictors of happiness include elements that support personal independence, a sense of personal agency, and self-expression. In Eastern cultures, predictors of happiness focus on an interdependent self that is inseparable from significant others. Compared to people in individualistic cultures, people in collectivistic cultures are more likely to base their judgments of life satisfaction on how significant others appraise their life than on the balance of inner emotions experienced as pleasant versus unpleasant. Pleasant emotional experiences have a stronger social component in East Asian cultures compared to Western ones. For example, people in Japan are more likely to associate happiness with interpersonally engaging emotions (such as friendly feelings), whereas people in the United States are more likely to associate happiness with interpersonally disengaging emotions (pride, for example). There are also cultural differences in motives and goals associated with happiness. For example, Asian Americans tend to experience greater happiness after achieving goals that are pleasing to or approved of by significant others compared to European Americans. There is also evidence that high self-esteem, a sense of personal control and a consistent sense of identity relate more strongly to SWB in Western cultures than they do in Eastern ones. However, this is not to say that these things are unimportant to SWB in Eastern cultures. Research has found that even within Eastern cultures, people with high self-esteem and a more consistent sense of identity are somewhat happier than those who are low in these characteristics. There is no evidence that low self-esteem and so on are actually beneficial to SWB in any known culture.

A large body of research evidence has confirmed that people in individualistic societies report higher levels of happiness than people in collectivistic ones and that socioeconomic factors alone are insufficient to explain this difference. In addition to political and economic differences, individualistic versus collectivistic nations reliably differ in a variety of psychological characteristics that are related to SWB, such as emotion norms and attitudes to the expression of individual needs. Collectivistic cultures are based around the belief that the individual exists for the benefit of the larger social unit, whereas more individualistic cultures assume the opposite. Collectivistic cultures emphasize maintaining social order and harmony and therefore expect members to suppress their personal desires when necessary in order to promote collective interests. Such cultures therefore consider self-regulation more important than self-expression or than individual rights. Individualistic cultures by contrast emphasize the inalienable value of each person and expect individuals to become self-directive and self-sufficient. Although people in collectivistic cultures may gain happiness from the social approval they receive from suppressing self-interest, research seems to suggest that self-expression produces a greater happiness "payoff" compared to seeking approval outside oneself.

Despite westerners reporting higher levels of subjective well-being than easterners, they also have more frequent reports of depression. The differing beliefs on self-expression help explain what may at first seem paradoxical. Westerners tend to encourage individual expression, which leads to a greater focus on one's own emotions. This increased self-awareness combines with the normative belief that joy should be more common than sadness. People living under these conditions can catastrophize their own negative emotions; feeling increased sadness over the fact that they are either not currently happy or frequently happy. Easterners tend to be more concerned about their collective's feelings over their own individual feelings. They do not typically catastrophize their sadness, and learn to brush it off.

Positive psychology
Positive psychology is particularly concerned with the study of SWB. Positive psychology was founded by Seligman and Csikszentmihalyi (2000) who identified that psychology is not just the study of pathology, weakness, and damage; but it is also the study of strength and virtue. Researchers in positive psychology have pointed out that in almost every culture studied the pursuit of happiness is regarded as one of the most valued goals in life. Understanding individual differences in SWB is of key interest in positive psychology, particularly the issue of why some people are happier than others. Some people continue to be happy in the face of adversity whereas others are chronically unhappy at the best of times.

Positive psychology has investigated how people might improve their level of SWB and maintain these improvements over the longer term, rather than returning to baseline. Lyubomirsky (2001) argued that SWB is influenced by a combination of personality/genetics (studies have found that genetic influences usually account for 35-50% of the variance in happiness measures), external circumstances, and activities that affect SWB. She argued that changing one's external circumstances tends to have only a temporary effect on SWB, whereas engaging in activities (mental and/or physical) that enhance SWB can lead to more lasting improvements in SWB.

Use in happiness economics
SWB is often used in appraising the wellbeing of populations.

See also
 Canadian Index of Wellbeing
 Positive psychology
 Personality psychology
 Hedonic treadmill
 Flourishing
 Flow (psychology)
 Sonja Lyubomirsky
 Ed Diener
 Religion and happiness
 Reasonable Person Model
 Happiness economics

References

External links
 World Values Survey web site
 The happiness show
 Martin Seligman's Authentic Happiness site

Positive psychology
Emotions
Personal life
Happiness
Suffering
Quality of life
Mental health
Subjective experience
Well-being